Albert James Skinner (born 1868; date of death unknown) was an English footballer who played as a full-back for Burslem Port Vale between 1886 and 1893.

Career
Skinner most likely joined Burslem Port Vale in the summer of 1886. He enjoyed regular football from October 1888 to February 1889, but was used mostly as a reserve player after this period. In total he played 30 games for his local team: 16 league games (12 in the Football Combination and one each in the English Football League and Midland Football League), 13 friendlies, and 3 cup matches. He was allowed to leave the Athletic Ground at the end of the 1892–93 season, the first ever season of the Football League Second Division.

Career statistics
Source:

References

1868 births
Year of death missing
Sportspeople from Burslem
English footballers
Association football fullbacks
Port Vale F.C. players
Midland Football League players
English Football League players